The 2011–12 season was Manchester City Ladies Football Club's 24th season of competitive football and its eleventh and final season in the FA Women's Premier League Northern Division before their promotion to the National Division.

Competitions

Premier League Northern Division

League table

Results summary

Results by matchday

Matches

FA Cup

WPL Cup

Group stage

Knock-out stages

References

11–12